Gabriel B. Zavala (died February 26, 2021) was a Mexican-born American mariachi musician and teacher, who became a "trailblazer" after moving to Orange County, California, where he played music with the group Los Siete Hermanos Zavala, and in 1996 started an academy, the Rhythmo Mariachi Academy, in Anaheim, California. 

Zavala died in Anaheim at age 76 from complications of COVID-19. After his death, his son Oliver continued the academy.

References

20th-century births
2021 deaths
People from Orange County, California
Mexican emigrants to the United States
Deaths from the COVID-19 pandemic in California